Big Creek is an unincorporated community in Houston County, Alabama, United States.

History
A post office operated under the name Big Creek from 1850 to 1906.

References

Unincorporated communities in Houston County, Alabama
Unincorporated communities in Alabama